Moti or MOTI may refer to:

Names

 Mordecai (disambiguation), a Hebrew given name, abbreviated Moti
 Motilal (disambiguation), an Indian given name often abbreviated Moti

People
 Moti (DJ) (Timotheus "Timo" Romme, born 1987), Dutch DJ and music producer
 Julian Moti (1965–2020), former attorney general of the Solomon Islands
 Cosmin Moți (born 1984), Romanian football player
 Moti Bodek (born 1961), Israeli architect
 Moti Daniel (born 1963), Israeli basketball player
 Moti Lugasi (born 1991), Israeli taekwondo athlete

Other uses
 Ministry of Trade and Industry (Ghana)
 Moti Island, a volcanic island on the western side of Halmahera Island
 Moți people, inhabitants of Romania's Țara Moților
 Mochi, a Japanese rice cake, in Kunrei-shiki/Nihon-shiki spelling 
 Moti, meaning "king" in the Oromo language
 Moti, meaning "pearl" in Hindi and Urdu, appearing in some place names, including:
 Moti Jheel
 Moti Nagar (disambiguation)
 Museum of the Islands, a museum in Pine Island Center, Lee County, Florida. 
 Moti Ka Haar, a 1937 film directed by Jaddanbai
 Stedelijk Museum Breda, formerly the Museum of the Image (MOTI), in the Netherlands

See also

Moti Mahal (disambiguation)